Viruá National Park is a national park in the state of Roraima, Brazil. It protects an area with very infertile sandy soil, periodically flooded, that has no economic value but has exceptionally high biodiversity.

Location

The Viruá National Park is in the Caracaraí municipality of Roraima.
The main river is the Viruá Igarapé, a blackwater river with little sediment, which flows into the Anauá River along the southern limit of the park.
The Anauá in turn feeds the Branco River, which forms the western boundary of the park.
The Caracaraí Ecological Station and Niquiá Ecological Station lie along the opposite shore of the Branco River.
The park adjoins the Baixo Rio Branco-Jauaperi Extractive Reserve to the south and the Anauá National Forest to the southeast.

History

The Viruá National Park was created by decree on 29 April 1998.
It is classed as IUCN protected area category II (national park).
Objectives are to preserve natural ecosystems of great ecological relevance and scenic beauty, and to enable scientific research, educational activities, environmental interpretation, recreation in contact with nature and ecological tourism.
It is administered  by the Chico Mendes Institute for Biodiversity Conservation.
The conservation unit is supported by the Amazon Region Protected Areas Program.

On 4 November 2010 public consultation began on expanding the area of the park.
The consultative council was created on 20 November 2012.
The management plan was approved on 17 April 2014.

Environment

The park covers an extensive sandy plain, and holds the Viruá alluvial "megafan".
Soils are extremely poor in nutrients and highly acidic.
There is no potential for farming, grazing or forestry.
The park is subject to seasonal flooding.
The park holds a great patchwork of campinaranas and open or closed canopy forests.
The many environments support high biodiversity, and the park is one of the main areas for studying campinarana. More than 2,000 plants species have been identified, and it is estimated that there are more than 5,000 in total, making it one of the most botanically diverse conservation units in Brazil.

Notes

Sources

National parks of Brazil
Protected areas of Roraima
Ramsar sites in Brazil